Chiappe is a surname. Notable people with the surname include:

Luis M. Chiappe, Argentine paleontologist
Jean Chiappe, high-ranking French civil servant
María Luisa Chiappe, Colombian economist, diplomat, civil servant and businesswoman
Sandro Mariátegui Chiappe, Peruvian politician